Handes Amsorya (Monthly Review) is an academic journal that publishes research papers and articles on Armenian studies, especially history, art, social sciences, linguistics, and philology. It was established in 1887 by the Mechitarian order in Vienna.

See also
Bazmavep
Haigazian Armenological Review 
Patma-Banasirakan Handes
Revue des Études Arméniennes

References 

Armenian studies journals
Publications established in 1887
Monthly journals
Armenian-language journals
Mekhitarist Order
Magazines published in Vienna
Armenian Catholic Church in Austria